"Pokémon Theme" (also known as "Gotta catch ’em all!") is a song written by John Siegler and John Loeffler and performed by Jason Paige. It is the original theme song for the first season of the English adaptation of the Pokémon anime. Since its release, the song has been virtually synonymous with the Pokémon franchise because the line "Gotta catch ’em all!" has become its official English slogan; it is derived from the Japanese ポケモンGETだぜ! ("Pokemon [getto] da ze!").

"Pokémon Theme" is a fast-paced pop rock song with continuous male vocals intermixed with backup vocal accompaniment that also sings the chorus: "Pokémon! (Gotta catch ’em all!").

History
Siegler and Loeffler wrote the lyrics to the song while Siegler (previously a bassist for bands including Todd Rundgren's Utopia and Hall & Oates) produced the track, also playing keyboards, bass, and drums. David Rolfe, the vocalist for later themes of the series, played the guitar while Jason Paige provided the vocals. Although the theme song premiered on the debut episode "Pokémon, I Choose You!" on September 8, 1998, Jason Paige was called back again in 1999 to produce an extended version of the theme song for the album Pokémon 2.B.A. Master.

According to Norman Grossfeld, the then-president of 4Kids Productions, the line "Gotta catch 'em all!" was created as a "tagline for marketing purposes that would also be included in the theme song". It is derived from the Japanese tagline "(ポケモンGETだぜ!, Pokémon getto da ze!)" Furthermore, "Gotta Catch 'em all!" came from a series of contenders, which included "Catch 'em if you can" (which made it in an earlier version of the theme song). Meanwhile, when first approached about the theme song, Siegler initially saw the show's concept as "incomprehensible" before realizing that the series was about friendship. Although he was reluctant at first, he saw the show's potential when he took his son to premiere of the debut episode in Columbus Circle.

In November 2005, the Internet comedy duo Smosh recorded a video for the song on YouTube. It became the most viewed video on the site before being surpassed by "The Evolution of Dance". Afterwards, Smosh's video was removed on YouTube due to a copyright notice. The original video was later reuploaded by fans. Then in 2010, Smosh themselves recreated the video, this time with altered lyrics being critical of the original video being taken down. During the 2012 primary election, Paige himself performed a parody of the song in support of the Republican candidate Ron Paul. In 2015, the song was voted to be part of the annual Dutch Top 2000 radio marathon, after a call-for-action on Facebook went viral within the country.

Resurgence
In July 2016, after the release of the mobile game Pokémon Go, the song had a 382% increase in listeners on music streaming platform Spotify. There were instances of police cars playing the song through loudspeakers while driving near Pokémon Go players, as well as groups of people singing the song in public. Afterwards, Dutch electronic music artist Hardwell played the theme at the 2016 edition of Ultra Europe as one of his final tunes. The same month, after rising up to 1,079% in sales, the song hit number four on Billboard'''s "Kids Digital Songs" chart after initially peaking at 10 in 2010, as well as peaking at number three on the "Hot Dance Singles Sales" chart. Despite the resurgence, Paige did not receive any royalties from the song.

In an interview with the New York Post, Paige claimed that he did not originally expect the song to become popular when he first recorded it, stating that he "didn’t really know much about Pokémon" when he did the demo, other than a scene in the animated series that caused bouts of epileptic seizures in Japan. Although Paige recorded the song in four hours, he received a large one-time payment for the song in 2000. Paige also performed another parody of the song, featuring Dwayne Johnson as a Pokémon as well as YouTube stars MatPat and Ali-A.

In December 2016, the song reached spot 232 on the Dutch Top 2000, a difference of over 1400 spots compared to its ranking in the previous year.

In 2017, Jason Paige performed and recorded a Japanese version of the Pokémon Theme.

On November 16, 2018, an official trailer for Pokémon: Let's Go, Pikachu! and Let's Go, Eevee! featured the original theme song. On February 26, 2019, the song was used again in the film, Pokémon Detective Pikachu, as well as the film's second trailer.

2016 recording
In 2016, due to response to the success of the mobile app Pokémon Go, Paige re-recorded the theme.

Charts

Cover versions
The theme song has been covered by various groups and people. "Pokémon Theme" was first covered by Billy Crawford for Pokémon: The First Movie. Afterwards, it was covered again by Ben Dixon and The Sad Truth for the English broadcast of Pokémon: XY.  Ben Dixon once again covered it for Pokémon the Movie: I Choose You! Others who have covered the theme song included Postmodern Jukebox, Kurt Hugo Schneider with Lindsey Stirling, Eric Calderone, Baracksdubs, Tay Zonday, Powerglove, Pat Cashman & Xander Mobus as announcers from Super Smash Bros., Nathan Sykes, and Anthony Vincent.

In 2014, Electric Six recorded a cover of the song as part of a pledge package for their "Absolute Treasure" Kickstarter campaign and Postmodern Jukebox also covered it with Andromeda Turre vocally leading an orchestrated style arrangement.

In 2015, a smooth jazz arranged version was recorded by Scott Bradlee with Sara Niemietz singing the vocals.

Jonathan Young covered the song in 2018, featuring Jason Paige in a heavy metal version of the original song.

Poppy released her cover of the song in 2020 after a snippet of it was leaked online.

Media appearances
The theme song was also featured in the 2000 video game Pokémon Puzzle League, as well as the 2004 video game, Donkey Konga.

During the Eurovision Song Contest 2021, the Norwegian representative, russ music artist Andreas Haukeland, better known as Tix, sang a parody of the theme song as a love serenade to the Azerbaijani representative, Samira Efendi, whom Tix had shown an affection for since the beginning of the contest. The song contains lyrics such as “I will travel across [Rotterdam] Ahoy / Searching far and wide / Teach Efendi to understand / The power that’s inside”.''

See also
List of Pokémon theme songs

References

1999 songs
Animated series theme songs
Children's television theme songs
Songs about fictional characters
Songs about monsters
Songs from Pokémon